Vas Népe is a Hungarian daily newspaper, published in Vas County. It usually has between 16 and 28 pages, and has a print run of 60,000 and a readership of around 185,000. 

The Sunday edition includes supplements and can be taken separately, functioning as a weekly newspaper and magazine, analogous to many newspapers in the United Kingdom such as The Times and The Sunday Times.

The editor is Miklós Halmágyi and the publisher is Pannon Lapok Társasága.

Daily features
 News
 Focus
 Economy
 Culture
 TV and radio listings
 Sport
 Classified advertisements
 Miscellany

Regular features
 Topical humour (Saturdays)
 "Promenades" (student essays)
 Lifestyle
 Domestic animals
 Cinema listings
 Celebrities
 Music
 Health
 Fashion
 Property (Realty)

Supplements
 Weekend
 Automotive
 Construction
 Passing-out ceremonies
 Television and radio reviews

Local editions
On Wednesdays and Fridays there are eleven local editions:
 Szombathely
 Kőszeg
 Csepreg
 Bük
 Sárvár
 Celldömölk
 Répcelak
 Szentgotthárd
 Körmend
 Vasvár
 Őriszentpéter

Each edition has the same main section and an inserted section covering more-local news.

Addresses
 Main office: 40 Széll Kálmán St., Szombathely
 City offices: Celldömölk, Körmend, Kőszeg, Sárvár, Szentgotthárd, Vasvár
 Printers: West Hungary Nyomda Centrum, Veszprém

External links
 Official site

Daily newspapers published in Hungary
Vas County